Marco Antonio Saravia Antinori (born 6 February 1999) is a Peruvian footballer who plays as a centre-back for Peruvian Primera División side Universitario de Deportes.

Club career

Early years
Saravia started playing football at the age of five, after his parents took him to a sports school. He then went to Lima Cricket and Football Club and later Academia Deportiva Cantolao, where he played for 7–8 years.

Deportivo Municipal
Saravia joined Deportivo Municipal in 2017, starting on the club's reserve team. After six months, he was promoted to the first team. He got his official first team debut on 21 October 2017 against Sport Huancayo. He started on the bench but replaced José Guidino in the half time. He played one further game for Municipal in the 2017 season.

Loan spells
In December 2018 it was confirmed, that Saravia would play for Brazilian team Grêmio on loan for the 2018 season, where he mainly was going to play for the club's U20 team. However, Saravia revealed in mid-August, that he was considering returning to Municipal, because there was no more official games left for him until the end of the year, after Grêmio's U20 team was eliminated from the U20 tournament. Later on the same day he announced on Instagram, that he had returned to Peru. After returning, he was loaned out to Unión Comercio for the rest of the year, where he made two appearances in the Peruvian Primera División.

In the 2019 season, Saravia was loaned out to Peruvian Segunda División club, Unión Huaral. He made a total of 16 appearances and scored one goal. He then returned to Municipal for the 2020 season, where he continued to play for the reserve team. In the summer 2020, Saravia moved to Cusco FC.

Back to Municipal
In December 2020 Municipal confirmed, that Saravia had returned to the club and would be a part of the clubs squad. He got shirt number 23 after his return. At the end of November 2021, after a good 2021 season with 17 games and 1310 minutes of minutes in the league, Saravia signed a new contract with Municipal until the end of 2023.

International career
Saravia was a part of the Peruvian 2014 Summer Youth Olympics team, that won the tournament. In January 2019, he was called up for the Peruvian U20 squad, who was going to play in the 2019 South American U-20 Championship. He got his debut on 26 January 2019 against Argentina, which Peru lost 0-1. In January 2020, he was also called up for the Peruvian U23 squad, however, he sat on the bench in all four games.

References

External links
 
 

Living people
1999 births
Association football defenders
Peruvian footballers
Peruvian expatriate footballers
Peruvian Primera División players
Peruvian Segunda División players
Academia Deportiva Cantolao players
Deportivo Municipal footballers
Grêmio Foot-Ball Porto Alegrense players
Unión Comercio footballers
Unión Huaral footballers
Cusco FC footballers
Footballers from Lima
Peruvian expatriate sportspeople in Brazil
Expatriate footballers in Brazil